William Alexander Kirkland (September 15, 1901, Mexico City, Mexico –  1986) was a leading man in Hollywood during the early sound era as well as a stage actor who starred in productions of the Group Theatre in New York.

Biography
Kirkland was born on September 15, 1901, in Mexico City, the son of Robert Gowland Kirkland and Charlotte Megan. He was the grandson of rear admiral William Alexander Kirkland and Consuela Gowland.

Kirkland attended the Taft School in Watertown, Connecticut and the University of Virginia. He later attended the Pennsylvania Academy of Fine Arts, and while in Philadelphia, he began his acting career  at the Hedgerow Theatre in Media, Pennsylvania. His first play on Broadway was The Devil to Pay.

He was also a freelance writer and contributed stories to popular national magazines. In the late 1920s, Kirkland moved to Hollywood and starred as leading man to Tallulah Bankhead in Tarnished Lady (1931). Other credits include Charlie Chan's Chance (1932), Social Register (1934) A Face in the Crowd (1957), A Passport to Hell and Devil's Lottery.

In the 1930s, he was associated with the Group Theatre (New York), founded by Harold Clurman, Cheryl Crawford and Lee Strasberg.

On radio, Kirkland played David Brewster in the soap opera Big Sister in the early 1940s, Curt Lansing in John's Other Wife, and Russell Barrington in Society Girl in that same era.

He toured as one of the Yale Puppeteers and then worked with the troupe at the Turnabout Theatre in Los Angeles, which operated from 1941 to 1956. His friend and theater colleague Forman Brown used him as the model for one of his characters in the early gay novel Better Angel (1933).

He married entertainer Gypsy Rose Lee in 1942. Carl Van Doren introduced them. They separated after three months and finally were divorced in 1944. Their son Eric later was recognized as the son of director Otto Preminger.

From 1944 to 1950, he was married to socialite, actress, and TV producer Phyllis Adams (1923-2004), and they had one daughter, Alexandra "Sandy" Marsh, who committed suicide falling from the Park Belvedere 28th floor in 1987. Adams later remarried in 1955 to art director George Jenkins.

In the 1950s, Kirkland owned an art gallery in Palm Beach, Florida, and in 1945, he purchased Villa del Sarmiento, an oceanfront Palm Beach estate.

In 1959, he married Greta Hunter-Thompson Baldridge, a former Ziegfeld Follies girl, widow of a co-heir of the National Steel Corporation. They lived in Palm Beach, Fairfield, Connecticut, and Cuernavaca, Mexico. Greta died in 1972 in Mexico City.

After the death of his third wife, Kirkland was connected to British actress Margot Grahame.

At the time of his death, Kirkland was living in Cuernavaca, and his daughter said he had wasted all of his money.

Broadway credits
 Wings Over Europe (1928)
 Men in White (1933)
 Gold Eagle Guy (1934)
 Till the Day I Die (1935)
 Weep for the Virgins (1935)
 The Case of Clyde Griffiths (1936)
 Many Mansions (1937)

Filmography
This filmography is believed to be complete.

References

External links

Alexander Kirkland profile, hollywoodheyday.blogspot.com, August 2009; accessed July 26, 2015.
Profile, broadway.cas.sc.edu; accessed July 26, 2015.

1901 births
1980s deaths
American male film actors
20th-century American male actors
Year of death uncertain
Place of death unknown
Date of death unknown
American expatriates in Mexico